Ras Jua Baraka (born April 9, 1970) is an American educator, author, and politician who is the 40th and current Mayor of Newark, New Jersey. He was previously a member of the Municipal Council of Newark and the principal of the city's Central High School until he took an indefinite leave of absence to run for the 2014 Newark mayoral election, which he won on May 13, 2014. Baraka was sworn in as the city's 40th mayor at ceremonies at the New Jersey Performing Arts Center on July 1, 2014, for a four-year term.
He won re-election twice in 2018 and 2022.

Early life and education
A Newark native, Baraka is the son of poet and activist Amiri Baraka and his wife Amina.
Baraka was educated in the Newark Public Schools and subsequently earned a Bachelor of Arts in Political Science from Howard University in Washington, DC, and a Master of Arts in Education Supervision from St. Peter's University in Jersey City.

Career 
Baraka was the principal of Central High School from 2007 until 2013.

Spoken word
He was editor of In the tradition: an anthology of young Black writers (1992).

Baraka was featured on singer Lauryn Hill 1998 The Miseducation of Lauryn Hill, as the narrator of several interludes on the album. He also recorded the intro to The Score, The Fugees' second album. Baraka and Hill recorded an unreleased single together entitled "Hot Beverage in the Winter", which later featured on his spoken-word album Shorty for Mayor.

Baraka dedicated his collection of poems Black Girls Learn Love Hard to the life of his late sister, Shani Baraka, who had been fatally shot in 2003.
He had read as part of the city's Dodge Poetry Festival.

Since its inception in 2004 Baraka has participated in the National Political Hip-Hop Convention.

In 2019 Baraka released the spoken word video What We Want.

Political career

Newark Municipal Council
Between 2002 and 2006 Baraka was Newark Municipal Council member and in 2002 was appointed deputy mayor, and served that position until 2005. In November 2005, Baraka was voted to complete the term vacated by the deceased Councilmember-at-Large Donald Kofi Tucker.

In May 2010 he defeated then-councilman Oscar James II in a highly contested election, on a platform critical of Mayor Cory Booker. The election was documented on the Sundance reality television series Brick City, which stars Booker, Baraka and other Newark political and residential figures.

Newark mayoral elections
Baraka ran his first campaign for mayor when he was 24 years old, in 1994.

Baraka ran in the 2014 Newark mayoral election against former Assistant State Attorney General Shavar Jeffries, after fellow council members Anibal Ramos, Jr. and Darrin S. Sharif dropped out of the race. In August 2013, fellow council members Mildred C. Crump and Ronald C. Rice issued statements formally backing Baraka's candidacy. Baraka's slate for the municipal council included John Sharpe James (council member-at-large running for South Ward), Mildred C. Crump (council member at-large incumbent), Alturrick Kenney (at-large candidate), Patrick Council (at-large candidate) and Joe McCallum (West Ward candidate).

In December 2013, the Communication Workers of America, a trade union which counts 2000 members living, and thousands more working in Newark, endorsed Baraka. In February 2014 he received the endorsement of former New Jersey governor Richard Codey and Jersey City mayor Steven Fulop. In March he was endorsed by 1199SEIU United Healthcare Workers East.

On May 13, 2014, Baraka was elected mayor of Newark. Official results show that of 44,951 ballots cast, he received 24,358 to Jeffries' 20,593. He succeeds Luis A. Quintana, after completing the term of Cory Booker, who had resigned after being elected to the United States Senate in October 2013. Baraka was sworn in as the city's 40th mayor by former Governor of New Jersey Richard Codey at ceremonies at the New Jersey Performing Arts Center on July 1, 2014, for a four-year term.

Transition team and municipal council composition 
Soon after winning the election, Baraka had initiated meetings with Cory Booker on May 19 with Governor Chris Christie, and Essex Executive Joseph N. DiVincenzo, Jr. on May 21.

On May 28, 2014, Baraka announced his transition team, headed by former mayor Kenneth Gibson, comprising sixteen committees that will report to him before his inauguration.

In the 2014 local elections four of the municipal council candidates Baraka supported won their races, leading the expectation that the elected body, in which he needs five votes on the nine-member council to get any proposal passed, will be cooperative to his agenda. His preferred candidates who won seats on the council last month include: At-large Councilwoman Mildred C. Crump, and union leader Eddie Osborne in the at-large race and At-large Councilman John Sharpe James in the South Ward race and Gayle Chaneyfield-Jenkins in the Central Ward race. Incumbents East Ward Councilman Augusto Amador North Ward Councilman Anibal Ramos, Jr. and At-large Councilman Carlos Gonzalez were also re-elected on Shavar Jeffries' ticket. Mayor Luis A. Quintana, who was elected to be an at-large councilman, ran as an independent.

Baraka appointed his brother, Amiri "Middy" Baraka, Jr. as his chief of staff.

During his tenure as mayor he has earned praise for improving Newark's economic prospects.

Baraka and the City of Newark duped by “sister city” scam 

In early 2023, Educator/Mayor Ras Baraka invited representatives of "Kailasa" to Newark's City Hall for a "cultural trade agreement" with the “Hindu nation,” but "Kailasa" isn't a real country. Baraka, along with the municipal council, was duped by (Swami) Nithyananda, a notorious scam artist and fugitive from India (2019 rape charges).

Baraka and Newark were not aware of the scam until after the New Jersey city held an official ceremony. Footage shows city officials, including Baraka,  taking photographs and signing documents to become a "Sister City" with "Kailasa." 

Newark City Hall called the scam a “regrettable incident,” a council member referred to it as an “oversight,” and Newark residents expressed embarrassment that city officials did not bother to perform a basic Google search to determine “Kailasa” is not a real country.

Political positions

Uber
The mayor of Newark, New Jersey, has released details on a tentative agreement he's reached with Uber to operate in the state's largest city. The deal calls for Uber to pay Newark $1 million a year for 10 years for permission to operate at Newark Liberty International Airport, which serves the New York City region and is one of the busiest airports in the nation. The San Francisco-based company also will provide $1.5 million in liability coverage for all drivers in its network.

Newark Schools
The Newark Public Schools system (serving approximately 40,000 students) was placed under state control in 1994. Newark is one of 31 "Abbott", or "SDA district" which requires the state to cover all costs for school building and renovation projects in these districts under the supervision of the New Jersey Schools Development Authority.

In 2010 Mark Zuckerberg, the founder of Facebook, donated $100 million of his personal fortune through his foundation StartUp Education to the Newark school system. Release of the funds required matching funds, which were mostly raised through the Foundation for Newark's Future and have largely been spent, though funds remain. The foundation was a short-term philanthropic "shot in the arm". By 2015, FNF and its partners will have spent $200 million. The donation precipitated an effort to reform and restructure the system.

Teams of consultants have suggested numerous management reforms from the top down, but according to Ras Baraka, echoing concerns of many residents, they have ignored the community and the needs of children and wishes of families in the neighborhoods. A restructuring program called One Newark calls for the closure of some public schools and the opening of more charter schools (some in public school buildings).
The reorganization, spearheaded by state-appointed Superintendent Cami Anderson, would relocate, consolidate or close one quarter of the district's schools that she has determined are underutilized. The plan has met with stiff resistance from large segments of Newark's population, with critics saying there's no evidence it will increase student performance. The plan would also include teacher lay-offs. While there is some agreement with many of the policies being implemented in the program, the disregard for community input and the pace of change has drawn criticism. The plan will require some students to leave their neighborhoods and travel across the city, with many parents fearing for their safety.

Baraka ran for election with a campaign to take back local control of the schools. In May 2014, Newark, which already had control of operations (includes student transportation and other support services), was granted local powers over budget and finance, giving the local advisory board its first formal vote on the district's nearly $1 billion in annual spending. The state retains the right to veto any action of the local board and has the final say in appointing the superintendent of the district. Baraka, as an outspoken advocate of returning control of Newark's schools to local authority, has called for the ouster of state-appointed Superintendent Anderson. Anderson's contract was renewed in June 2014.

A discrimination complaint filed on behalf of Newark parents and the Newark branch of New Jersey's Parents Unified for Local School Education (PULSE) claims that 86 percent of the students affected by "One Newark" changes are African American, while African-American students make up 51 percent of the entire district. The allegation is being investigated by the United States Department of Education's Office of Civil Rights.

Baraka has called for the resignation of Cami Anderson, the state-appointed superintendent. Anderson resigned in June 2015. While Anderson's resignation made the situation less politically volatile, Baraka opposes the creation of more charter schools, and believes they come at the expense of public schools.

Crime and gang violence
In October 2013 Baraka introduced his program to deal with crime and gang violence in the city, the Ras Baraka Blueprint to Reduce Crime and Violence in Newark. It includes "Project Chill", which incorporates elements similar to Boston's Operation Ceasefire and other engagement with gang members and intervention programs. As of June 30 there had been 43 homicides in 2014. In 2013 through June 30, the city recorded 41 homicides. A surge of violence in the second half of 2013 pushed the homicide total to 111, the most since 1990. In 2019 and 2020 the city had 51 homicides.

In Fall 2014, Baraka started the Model Neighborhood initiative, which increased police presence in troubled neighborhoods.

Underwater mortgages and eminent domain
Between 2008 and mid-2013, 6,810 homes were foreclosed in Newark, and citywide, and homeowners in the city and lost roughly $1.8 billion in home values. At that time about 9,000 Newark residents were "underwater", where payment balances are higher than the fair market value of the property. In May 2014, Baraka introduced a resolution adopted by the municipal council that would affect an estimated one thousand Newark homeowners threatened with foreclosure, giving the city legal authority to purchase home with underwater mortgages through eminent domain and refinancing them. it is estimated that more than 50% of Newark homes are financed by underwater mortgages, partially as a result of the 2010 United States foreclosure crisis.

Newark Watershed
The Newark Watershed comprises 35,000 acres of reservoirs and water treatment and supply systems for more than 500,000 customers in northern New Jersey including Newark and neighboring Belleville, Elizabeth, Bloomfield and Nutley. It is considered one of the city's greatest assets. A New Jersey State Comptroller report issued in February 2014 revealed irregularities and corruption within the Newark Watershed and Development Corporation, which is the process of being dismantled after being taken over by the city. In March 2014, Baraka called for a forensic audit of the agency. Despite protestations from the city council, in April 2014 a Superior Court judge ruled that the city must continue to fund the agency during the process.

In 2019 the Ras Baraka administration began a massive effort to replace lead water pipes that were causing lead in drinking water to exceed federal limits. By spring of 2021, local officials had removed more than 20,000 lead service lines.

Budget deficit and state oversight
In August 2014, citing a $30 million deficit in the city's 2013 budget and an anticipated $60 million deficit for 2014, Baraka said that Newark would likely have to ask for emergency aid from the state, which, if received, would require state oversight and involvement in the city's financial affairs. As of September 2014, the state's Local Finance Board, overseen by the New Jersey Department of Community Affairs, had not taken action. That same month, the city auctioned properties, most of which had been foreclosed, in an attempt to raise funds. The state's Department of Community Affairs awarded Newark $10 million in transitional aid, which comes with a required oversight memorandum of understanding. The state will hire a private firm to oversee the city's financial management and compliance. The state will reduce budgets for the city clerk and expenses for council members as part of the agreement.

Model Neighborhoods
In 2014, Baraka initiated a program, called Model Neighborhoods, intended to take a comprehensive approach to addressing the factors causing troubled neighborhoods.

Valentine's Day lot sales
In 2014, the city initiated a Valentine's Day building lot sale in which married couples could purchase housing plots in the city for $1,000, provided they built a house on the lot within 18 months. Nearly 100 plots were sold; as of 2015, few had been built on, due to insufficient financing.

Campaign financing irregularities accusation
In November 2017, Baraka and his campaign treasurer were issued a 28-count complaint by the New Jersey Election Law Enforcement Commission, alleging they violated campaign finance rules in the 2014 mayoral election, mainly for failure to fully disclose the source of $396,000 in campaign donations in the expensive and tightly contested campaign.

Personal life

Baraka is the father of three daughters Amandla, Assata, and Raisa. In 2019, Baraka married political consultant Linda Jumah, who mothered Baraka's son Jua Nyamekye Imamu Kofi Baraka, born in 2019. Through his father, some of his half-sisters are Kellie and Lisa Jones, and Dominique di Prima. Jones was their father's family name at birth.

See also
Mayors of Newark, New Jersey
Street Fight (film)

References

1970 births
21st-century American politicians
African-American mayors in New Jersey
American community activists
American school principals
Howard University alumni
Living people
Mayors of Newark, New Jersey
Members of the Municipal Council of Newark
New Jersey Democrats
African-American city council members in New Jersey
21st-century African-American politicians
20th-century African-American people